The University of Toamasina (French: Université de Tamatave) is a public university in Toamasina, Madagascar. The university campus is located in Barikadimy west of the city of Toamasina, the capital of Atsinanana on the east side of Madagascar.

The school was formerly part of the University of Madagascar system, along with public universities in Antananarivo, Antsiranana, Mahajanga, Toliara and Fianarantsoa.  In 1988 that system was reorganized and the member schools became separate institutions.

It runs the CEREL Museum.

External links
 University of Toamasina

Universities in Madagascar
University of Toamasina
Educational institutions established in 1988
1988 establishments in Madagascar